Allan Hawco is a Canadian writer, actor, and producer from Bell Island, Newfoundland. He is best known for his roles in the series Tom Clancy's Jack Ryan, Republic of Doyle, and The Book of Negroes, and the television limited series Caught.

Early and personal life
Hawco was born on Bell Island, Newfoundland and Labrador, as the youngest of four children and moved to Goulds at a young age. His father Michael worked on the Bell Island Ferry, and his mother Mary was an elementary school teacher and former nun. He studied business at Memorial University of Newfoundland but dropped out in favour of the National Theatre School of Canada. One of his brothers is a composer, and has composed for Republic of Doyle, while his father has also worked on the show and his mother has appeared as a background performer. Hawco is the youngest of four, also having two older sisters.

Hawco married CBC anchor Carolyn Stokes in 2012 in the midst of working on Republic of Doyle.

Career

Hawco's first role was in the Shakespeare by the Sea production of Macbeth, which was directed by Aiden Flynn. From there, director Danielle Irvine encouraged the young actor to audition for the National Theatre School where he was one of 13 selected from thousands of applicants that year.

After graduating from the National Theatre School of Canada in 2000, Hawco worked in many of the major theatres in Canada. In 2005, motivated by the want for greater creative control, he started his own production company the Company Theatre with Philip Riccio. The company's inaugural production, A Whistle in the Dark, brought Hawco critical acclaim. Their 2009 production of Festen won him three Dora Awards, including Outstanding Production of a Play.

Some of Hawco's earlier movie roles include Canadian productions such as Making Love in Saint Pierre, Above and Beyond, and Love and Savagery, the latest of which won him an ACTRA nomination for Outstanding Male Performance. His career took off with the launch of his own TV series Republic of Doyle, which premiered in 2010. Hawco is co-creator with Perry Chafe and Malcolm MacRury, executive producer, lead actor, head writer as well as the show's showrunner. The show has been sold to over 90 countries, and maintained over a million viewers a week on CBC television in Canada.

In 2010, Hawco was nominated for the ACTRA Toronto award for Outstanding Performance – Male for his performance in Love and Savagery. He was also nominated that year for two Gemini Awards, Best Performance by an Actor in a Continuing Leading Dramatic Role and Best Dramatic Series for his work as actor, co-creator, writer and executive producer of Republic of Doyle.

In 2011, Hawco was the recipient of the National Theatre School's prestigious Gascon-Thomas Award.

Also in 2011, Hawco was presented with the Canadian Film and Television Hall of Fame's Outstanding Achievement Award.

In 2016, Hawco's production company in Newfoundland produced the Netflix original series: Frontier, starring Jason Momoa. Hawco also stars in the series as well as functioning as an executive producer on the show.

In 2018, Hawco served as executive producer, writer/showrunner and starred in the CBC adaptation of Lisa Moore's novel Caught. The series received a number of CSA nominations including best series and a best actor nod for Hawco. Caught other screen writers include Hawco's writing partner Perry Chafe, John Kirzanc, Julia Cohan, and Adriana Maggs. Caught is distributed by eOne entertainment, and eOne exec Tecca Crosby was the inspiration behind the making of the limited series according to interviews with Hawco on the topic.

In 2019, Hawco starred as "Coyote" in the Amazon Prime TV series Jack Ryan alongside John Krasinski and Wendell Pierce. Jack Ryan was written by Lost creator Carlton Cuse. Filming took place in Colombia. 2019 also saw Hawco feature as Captain Donovan in the British-Canadian suspense Drama Departure.

Filmography

Films

Television

Theatre

Awards

References

External links

1977 births
Living people
20th-century Canadian male actors
21st-century Canadian male actors
Canadian male film actors
Canadian male screenwriters
Canadian male television actors
Canadian male television writers
Canadian male voice actors
Canadian people of Ukrainian descent
Canadian television directors
Canadian television producers
Canadian television writers
Male actors from Newfoundland and Labrador
National Theatre School of Canada alumni
People from Newfoundland (island)
Writers from Newfoundland and Labrador